Alvdal Idrettslag is a Norwegian sports club from Alvdal, founded in 1902. It has sections for association football, Nordic skiing, biathlon, orienteering, team handball and volleyball.

Famous skiers include Embret Mellesmo, Per Samuelshaug, Ottar Gjermundshaug, Oddmund Jensen, Erling Bjørn, Kristian Bjørn, Per Bjørn and Torgeir Bjørn. The club became Norwegian relay champion in 1958 and 1959. Former football players include Harald Stormoen and Per Gunnar Dalløkken.

Recent seasons

Men
{| 
|valign="top" width=0%|

Women
{| 
|valign="top" width=0%|

References

External links
 Official site 

Football clubs in Norway
Sport in Hedmark
Alvdal
Association football clubs established in 1902
1902 establishments in Norway